Saul Bellow (born Solomon Bellows; July 10, 1915 – April 5, 2005) was an American writer. For his literary work, Bellow was awarded the Pulitzer Prize, the Nobel Prize for Literature, and the National Medal of Arts. He is the only writer to win the National Book Award for Fiction three times, and he received the National Book Foundation's lifetime Medal for Distinguished Contribution to American Letters in 1990.

In the words of the Swedish Nobel Committee, his writing exhibited
[T]he mixture of rich picaresque novel and subtle analysis of our culture, of entertaining adventure, drastic and tragic episodes in quick succession interspersed with philosophic conversation, all developed by a commentator with a witty tongue and penetrating insight into the outer and inner complications that drive us to act, or prevent us from acting, and that can be called the dilemma of our age.
His best-known works include The Adventures of Augie March, Henderson the Rain King, Herzog, Mr. Sammler's Planet, Seize the Day, Humboldt's Gift, and Ravelstein.

Bellow said that of all his characters, Eugene Henderson, of Henderson the Rain King, was the one most like himself.<ref name="nytimes">{{cite news|url=https://www.nytimes.com/2005/04/06/books/06bellow.html|title=The New York Times, Mel Gussow and Charles McGrath[2005], in Saul Bellow, Who Breathed Life into American Novel, Dies at 89. |newspaper=nytimes.com|date=April 6, 2005 |access-date=August 26, 2015|last1=Gussow |first1=Mel |last2=McGrath |first2=Charles }}</ref> Bellow grew up as an immigrant from Quebec. As Christopher Hitchens describes it, Bellow's fiction and principal characters reflect his own yearning for transcendence, a battle "to overcome not just ghetto conditions but also ghetto psychoses." Bellow's protagonists wrestle with what Albert Corde, the dean in The Dean's December, called "the big-scale insanities of the 20th century." This transcendence of the "unutterably dismal" (a phrase from Dangling Man) is achieved, if it can be achieved at all, through a "ferocious assimilation of learning" (Hitchens) and an emphasis on nobility.

Biography

Early life
Saul Bellow was born Solomon Bellows in Lachine, Quebec, two years after his parents, Lescha (née Gordin) and Abraham Bellows, emigrated from Saint Petersburg, Russia. He had three elder siblings - sister Zelda (later Jane, born in 1907), brothers Moishe (later Maurice, born in 1908) and Schmuel (later Samuel, born in 1911). Bellow's family was Lithuanian-Jewish; his father was born in Vilnius. Bellow celebrated his birthday on June 10, although he appears to have been born on July 10, according to records from the Jewish Genealogical Society-Montreal. (In the Jewish community, it was customary to record the Hebrew date of birth, which does not always coincide with the Gregorian calendar.) Of his family's emigration, Bellow wrote: 

A period of illness from a respiratory infection at age eight both taught him self-reliance (he was a very fit man despite his sedentary occupation) and provided an opportunity to satisfy his hunger for reading: reportedly, he decided to be a writer when he first read Harriet Beecher Stowe's Uncle Tom's Cabin.When Bellow was nine, his family moved to the Humboldt Park neighborhood on the West Side of Chicago, the city that formed the backdrop of many of his novels. Bellow's father, Abraham, had become an onion importer. He also worked in a bakery, as a coal delivery man, and as a bootlegger. Bellow's mother, Liza, died when he was 17. She had been deeply religious and wanted her youngest son, Saul, to become a rabbi or a concert violinist. But he rebelled against what he later called the "suffocating orthodoxy" of his religious upbringing, and he began writing at a young age. Bellow's lifelong love for the Torah began at four when he learned Hebrew. Bellow also grew up reading Shakespeare and the great Russian novelists of the 19th century.

In Chicago, he took part in anthroposophical studies at the Anthroposophical Society of Chicago. Bellow attended Tuley High School on Chicago's west side where he befriended Yetta Barsh and Isaac Rosenfeld. In his 1959 novel Henderson the Rain King, Bellow modeled the character King Dahfu on Rosenfeld.

Education and early career
Bellow attended the University of Chicago but later transferred to Northwestern University. He originally wanted to study literature, but he felt the English department was anti-Jewish. Instead, he graduated with honors in anthropology and sociology. It has been suggested Bellow's study of anthropology had an influence on his literary style, and anthropological references pepper his works. He later did graduate work at the University of Wisconsin.

Paraphrasing Bellow's description of his close friend Allan Bloom (see Ravelstein), John Podhoretz has said that both Bellow and Bloom "inhaled books and ideas the way the rest of us breathe air."

In the 1930s, Bellow was part of the Chicago branch of the Federal Writer's Project, which included such future Chicago literary luminaries as Richard Wright and Nelson Algren. Many of the writers were radical: if they were not members of the Communist Party USA, they were sympathetic to the cause. Bellow was a Trotskyist, but because of the greater numbers of Stalinist-leaning writers he had to suffer their taunts.

In 1941, Bellow became a naturalized United States citizen, after discovering, on attempting to enlist in the armed forces, that he had immigrated to the United States illegally as a child.

In 1943, Maxim Lieber was his literary agent.

During World War II, Bellow joined the merchant marine and during his service he completed his first novel, Dangling Man (1944) about a young Chicago man waiting to be drafted for the war.

From 1946 through 1948 Bellow taught at the University of Minnesota. In the fall of 1947, following a tour to promote his novel The Victim, he moved into a large old house at 58 Orlin Avenue SE in the Prospect Park neighborhood of Minneapolis.

In 1948, Bellow was awarded a Guggenheim Fellowship that allowed him to move to Paris, where he began writing The Adventures of Augie March (1953). Critics have remarked on the resemblance between Bellow's picaresque novel and the great 17th-century Spanish classic Don Quixote. The book starts with one of American literature's most famous opening paragraphs, and it follows its titular character through a series of careers and encounters, as he lives by his wits and his resolve. Written in a colloquial yet philosophical style, The Adventures of Augie March established Bellow's reputation as a major author.

In 1958, Bellow once again taught at the University of Minnesota. During this time, he and his wife Sasha received psychoanalysis from University of Minnesota Psychology Professor Paul Meehl.

In the spring term of 1961 he taught creative writing at the University of Puerto Rico at Río Piedras.
One of his students was William Kennedy, who was encouraged by Bellow to write fiction.

Return to Chicago and mid-career
Bellow lived in New York City for years, but returned to Chicago in 1962 as a professor at the Committee on Social Thought at the University of Chicago. The committee's goal was to have professors work closely with talented graduate students on a multi-disciplinary approach to learning. Bellow taught on the committee for more than 30 years, alongside his close friend, the philosopher Allan Bloom.

There were also other reasons for Bellow's return to Chicago, where he moved into the Hyde Park neighborhood with his third wife, Susan Glassman. Bellow found Chicago vulgar but vital, and more representative of America than New York. He was able to stay in contact with old high school friends and a broad cross-section of society. In a 1982 profile, Bellow's neighborhood was described as a high-crime area in the city's center, and Bellow maintained he had to live in such a place as a writer and "stick to his guns."

Bellow hit the bestseller list in 1964 with his novel Herzog. Bellow was surprised at the commercial success of this cerebral novel about a middle-aged and troubled college professor who writes letters to friends, scholars and the dead, but never sends them. Bellow returned to his exploration of mental instability, and its relationship to genius, in his 1975 novel Humboldt's Gift. Bellow used his late friend and rival, the brilliant but self-destructive poet Delmore Schwartz, as his model for the novel's title character, Von Humboldt Fleisher. Bellow also used Rudolf Steiner's spiritual science, anthroposophy, as a theme in the book, having attended a study group in Chicago. He was elected a Fellow of the American Academy of Arts and Sciences in 1969.

Nobel Prize and later career
Propelled by the success of Humboldt's Gift, Bellow won the Nobel Prize in literature in 1976. In the 70-minute address he gave to an audience in Stockholm, Sweden, Bellow called on writers to be beacons for civilization and awaken it from intellectual torpor.

The following year, the National Endowment for the Humanities selected Bellow for the Jefferson Lecture, the U.S. federal government's highest honor for achievement in the humanities. Bellow's lecture was entitled "The Writer and His Country Look Each Other Over."

From December 1981 to March 1982, Bellow was the Visiting Lansdowne Scholar at the University of Victoria (B.C.), and also held the title Writer-in-Residence. In 1998, he was elected to the American Philosophical Society.

Bellow traveled widely throughout his life, mainly to Europe, which he sometimes visited twice a year. As a young man, Bellow went to Mexico City to meet Leon Trotsky, but the expatriate Russian revolutionary was assassinated the day before they were to meet. Bellow's social contacts were wide and varied. He tagged along with Robert F. Kennedy for a magazine profile he never wrote, and was close friends with the author Ralph Ellison. His many friends included the journalist Sydney J. Harris and the poet John Berryman.

While sales of Bellow's first few novels were modest, that turned around with Herzog. Bellow continued teaching well into his old age, enjoying its human interaction and exchange of ideas. He taught at Yale University, University of Minnesota, New York University, Princeton University, University of Puerto Rico, University of Chicago, Bard College and Boston University, where he co-taught a class with James Wood ('modestly absenting himself' when it was time to discuss Seize the Day). In order to take up his appointment at Boston, Bellow moved in 1993 from Chicago to Brookline, Massachusetts, where he died on April 5, 2005, at age 89. He is buried at the Jewish cemetery Shir HeHarim of Brattleboro, Vermont.

While he read voluminously, Bellow also played the violin and followed sports. Work was a constant for him, but he at times toiled at a plodding pace on his novels, frustrating the publishing company.

His early works earned him the reputation as a major novelist of the 20th century, and by his death he was widely regarded as one of the greatest living novelists. He was the first writer to win three National Book Awards in all award categories. His friend and protege Philip Roth has said of him, "The backbone of 20th-century American literature has been provided by two novelists—William Faulkner and Saul Bellow. Together they are the Melville, Hawthorne, and Twain of the 20th century." James Wood, in a eulogy of Bellow in The New Republic, wrote:

Personal life 
Bellow was married five times, with all but his last marriage ending in divorce. Bellow's wives were Anita Goshkin, Alexandra (Sondra) Tsachacbasov (daughter of painter Nahum Tschacbasov, Susan Glassman, Alexandra Ionescu Tulcea, and Janis Freedman.

His son Greg by his first marriage became a psychotherapist; he published Saul Bellow's Heart: A Son's Memoir in 2013, nearly a decade after his father's death. Bellow's son by his second marriage, Adam, published a nonfiction book In Praise of Nepotism in 2003. In 2000, when he was 84, Bellow had his fourth child and first daughter, with Freedman.

When he was married to his second wife Tschacbasov, his father-in-law was artist Nahum Tschacbasov.

Themes and style

Bellow's themes include the disorientation of contemporary society, and the ability of people to overcome their frailty and achieve greatness or awareness. Bellow saw many flaws in modern civilization, and its ability to foster madness, materialism and misleading knowledge. Principal characters in Bellow's fiction have heroic potential, and many times they stand in contrast to the negative forces of society. Often these characters are Jewish and have a sense of alienation or otherness.

Jewish life and identity is a major theme in Bellow's work, although he bristled at being called a "Jewish writer". Bellow's work also shows a great appreciation of America, and a fascination with the uniqueness and vibrancy of the American experience.

Bellow's work abounds in references and quotes from Marcel Proust and Henry James, among others, but he offsets these high-culture references with jokes. Bellow interspersed autobiographical elements into his fiction, and many of his principal characters were said to bear a resemblance to him.

Assessment

Martin Amis described Bellow as "The greatest American author ever, in my view".

For Linda Grant, "What Bellow had to tell us in his fiction was that it was worth it, being alive."

On the other hand, Bellow's detractors considered his work conventional and old-fashioned, as if the author were trying to revive the 19th-century European novel. In a private letter, Vladimir Nabokov described Bellow as a "miserable mediocrity". Journalist and author Ron Rosenbaum described Bellow's Ravelstein (2000) as the only book that rose above Bellow's failings as an author. Rosenbaum wrote,

Kingsley Amis, father of Martin Amis, was less impressed by Bellow. In 1971, Kingsley suggested that crime writer John D. MacDonald "is by any standards a better writer than Saul Bellow".

Sam Tanenhaus wrote in The New York Times Book Review in 2007:

But Tanenhaus went on to answer his question:

V. S. Pritchett praised Bellow, finding his shorter works to be his best. Pritchett called Bellow's novella Seize the Day a "small gray masterpiece."

Political views
As he grew older, Bellow moved decidedly away from leftist politics and became identified with cultural conservatism. His opponents included feminism, campus activism and postmodernism. Bellow also thrust himself into the often contentious realm of Jewish and African-American relations. Bellow was critical of multiculturalism and according to Alfred Kazin once said: "Who is the Tolstoy of the Zulus? The Proust of the Papuans? I'd be glad to read him." Bellow distanced himself somewhat from these remarks, which he characterized as "off the cuff obviously and pedantic certainly." He, however, stood by his criticism of multiculturalism, writing:

Despite his identification with Chicago, he kept aloof from some of that city's more conventional writers. In a 2006 interview with Stop Smiling magazine, Studs Terkel said of Bellow: "I didn't know him too well. We disagreed on a number of things politically. In the protests in the beginning of Norman Mailer's Armies of the Night, when Mailer, Robert Lowell and Paul Goodman were marching to protest the Vietnam War, Bellow was invited to a sort of counter-gathering. He said, 'Of course I'll attend'. But he made a big thing of it. Instead of just saying OK, he was proud of it. So I wrote him a letter and he didn't like it. He wrote me a letter back. He called me a Stalinist. But otherwise, we were friendly. He was a brilliant writer, of course. I love Seize the Day."

Attempts to name a street after Bellow in his Hyde Park neighborhood were halted by a local alderman on the grounds that Bellow had made remarks about the neighborhood's inhabitants that they considered racist. A one-block stretch of West Augusta Boulevard in Humboldt Park was named Saul Bellow Way in his honor instead.

Bellow was a supporter U.S. English, an organization formed in the early 1980s by John Tanton and former Senator S.I. Hayakawa, that supports making English the official language of the United States, and ended his association with the group in 1988.

Awards and honors

 1948 Guggenheim Fellowship
 1954 National Book Award for Fiction
 1965 National Book Award for Fiction
 1971 National Book Award for Fiction
 1976 Pulitzer Prize for Fiction
 1976 Nobel Prize in Literature
 1980 O. Henry Award
 1986 St. Louis Literary Award from the Saint Louis University Library Associates
 1988 National Medal of Arts
 1989 PEN/Malamud Award
 1989 Peggy V. Helmerich Distinguished Author Award
 1990 National Book Foundation's lifetime Medal for Distinguished Contribution to American Letters
1997 National Jewish Book Award for The Actual 2010 Inducted into the Chicago Literary Hall of Fame.

Bellow is represented in the collection of the National Portrait Gallery with six portraits, including a photograph by Irving Penn, a painting by Sarah Yuster, a bust by Sara Miller, and drawings by Edward Sorel and Arthur Herschel Lidov. A copy of the Miller bust was installed at the Harold Washington Library Center in 1993.
Bellow's papers are held at the library of the University of Chicago.

Bibliography

Novels and novellas
 Dangling Man (1944)
 The Victim (1947)
 The Adventures of Augie March (1953), National Book Award for Fiction
 Seize the Day (1956)
 Henderson the Rain King (1959)
 Herzog (1964), National Book Award
 Mr. Sammler's Planet (1970), National Book Award
 Humboldt's Gift (1975), winner of the 1976 Pulitzer Prize for Fiction
 The Dean's December (1982)
 More Die of Heartbreak (1987)
 A Theft (1989)
 The Bellarosa Connection (1989)
 The Actual (1997)
 Ravelstein (2000)

Short story collections
 Mosby's Memoirs and Other Stories (1968)
 Him with His Foot in His Mouth and Other Stories (1984)
 Something to Remember Me By: Three Tales (1991)
 Collected Stories (2001)

Plays
 The Last Analysis (1965)

Library of America editions
 Novels 1944–1953: Dangling Man, The Victim, The Adventures of Augie March (2003)
 Novels 1956–1964: Seize the Day, Henderson the Rain King, Herzog (2007)
 Novels 1970–1982: Mr. Sammler's Planet, Humboldt's Gift, The Dean's December (2010)
 Novels 1984–2000: What Kind of Day Did You Have?, More Die of Heartbreak, A Theft, The Bellarosa Connection, The Actual, Ravelstein (2014)

Translations
 "Gimpel the Fool"' (1945), short story by Isaac Bashevis Singer (translated by Bellow in 1953)

Non-fiction
 To Jerusalem and Back (1976), memoir
 It All Adds Up (1994), essay collection
 Saul Bellow: Letters, edited by Benjamin Taylor (2010), correspondence
 There Is Simply Too Much To Think About (Viking, 2015), collection of shorter non-fiction pieces

Works about Saul Bellow

 Saul Bellow's Heart: A Son's Memoir, Greg Bellow, 2013 
 Saul Bellow, Tony Tanner (1965) (see also his City of Words [1971])
 Saul Bellow, Malcolm Bradbury (1982)
 Saul Bellow Drumlin Woodchuck, Mark Harris, University of Georgia Press. (1982)
 Saul Bellow: Modern Critical Views, Harold Bloom (Ed.) (1986)
 Handsome Is: Adventures with Saul Bellow, Harriet Wasserman (1997)
 Saul Bellow and the Decline of Humanism, Michael K Glenday (1990)
 Saul Bellow: A Biography of the Imagination, Ruth Miller, St. Martins Pr. (1991)
 Bellow: A Biography, James Atlas (2000)
 Saul Bellow and American Transcendentalism, M.A. Quayum (2004)
 "Even Later" and "The American Eagle" in Martin Amis, The War Against Cliché (2001) are celebratory. The latter essay is also found in the Everyman's Library edition of Augie March.
 'Saul Bellow's comic style': James Wood in The Irresponsible Self: On Laughter and the Novel, 2004. .
 The Hero in Contemporary American Fiction: The Works of Saul Bellow and Don DeLillo , Stephanie Halldorson (2007)
 "Saul Bellow" a song, written by Sufjan Stevens on The Avalanche, which is composed of outtakes and other recordings from his concept album Illinois The Life of Saul Bellow: To Fame and Fortune, 1915–1964 (2015), and  The Life of Saul Bellow: Love and Strife, 1965–2005'' (2018), Zachary Leader

See also

 List of Jewish Nobel laureates
 PEN/Saul Bellow Award for Achievement in American Fiction
 List of oldest fathers

References

External links

 
 
 
 
Guide to the Saul Bellow Papers 1926–2015 at the University of Chicago Special Collections Research Center

1915 births
2005 deaths
20th-century American male writers
20th-century American novelists
20th-century Canadian male writers
20th-century Canadian novelists
American Nobel laureates
American Trotskyists
American male novelists
American male short story writers
American people of Lithuanian-Jewish descent
American short story writers
American socialists
Anglophone Quebec people
Anthroposophists
Bard College faculty
Burials in Vermont
Canadian Nobel laureates
Canadian emigrants to the United States
Canadian male novelists
Canadian people of Lithuanian-Jewish descent
Canadian socialists
Federal Writers' Project people
Fellows of the American Academy of Arts and Sciences
Jewish American novelists
Jewish American short story writers
Jewish Canadian writers
Jewish socialists
Massachusetts socialists
Members of the American Philosophical Society
National Book Award winners
Naturalized citizens of the United States
New York University faculty
The New Yorker people
Nobel laureates in Literature
Northwestern University alumni
Novelists from Illinois
Novelists from New York (state)
O. Henry Award winners
PEN/Malamud Award winners
People from Brookline, Massachusetts
People from Lachine, Quebec
Postmodern writers
Pulitzer Prize for Fiction winners
United States Merchant Mariners of World War II
United States National Medal of Arts recipients
University of Chicago alumni
University of Chicago faculty
University of Wisconsin–Madison alumni
Writers from Chicago
Writers from Montreal
Members of the American Academy of Arts and Letters